The Zall Tekke or Asim Baba Tekke is a Bektashi teqe in Gjirokastër, Albania. It is a Cultural Monument of Albania.

History
Seyyid Muhammed Asim Baba of Üsküdar (Istanbul) founded the tekke in 1780. It is also known as the Teqeja e Zallit (Gravel Tekke) or as the "Tekke of Pebbles" due to its location at the side of a river bed that is usually dry.

The tekke was administered by the following babas.
Asim Baba from 1780 to 1796
Hasan Baba Turku from 1796 to 1798
Sulejman Baba of Gjirokastra from 1798 to 1806
Ali Baba Gega from 1806 to 1830
Haxhi Jahja Baba of Kruja from 1830 to 1836
Ibrahim Baba Turku from 1836 to 1846
Hysejn Baba Elbasani from 1845 to 1861
Ali Haqi Baba of Elbasan from 1861 to 1907
Selim Ruhi Baba of Elbasan from 1907 to 1944

The tekke also hosted a library with books and manuscripts in Arabic, Persian, Turkish, and later also Albanian. For 3 years during the Balkan Wars and also during World War I, Greek soldiers were stationed at the tekke, which did not have any babas and dervishes at the time due to the wars. The baba and dervishes later returned, and the tekke was restored in 1916.

References 

Cultural Monuments of Albania
Buildings and structures in Gjirokastër
Ottoman architecture in Albania
Sufi tekkes in Albania
Bektashi tekkes
Ottoman mausoleums